Will Tsai is a Taiwanese-Canadian visualist magician. He is a former contestant on America's Got Talent Season 12.

Background 
Tsai was born in Taiwan, and immigrated to Canada with his family at the age of 15. His parents fell on difficult times, and Tsai had to work multiple jobs to assist his family financially. After stumbling on a magician's street performance, he was inspired to become a magician himself. He has been practicing magic for 13 years.

Career 
Tsai has been producing magic videos and products under the company name SansMinds since 2010, and has created multiple tricks, props, and devices for magicians and performers. Although he began his career developing tricks like Holely and Trace, Tsai eventually moved on to engineering stage props and devices such as VAPR, Absolute Zero, and VAPR Watch.

Tsai also operates under the nickname The Visualist, as he believes he cannot be fully categorized alongside other magicians or illusionists due to his personal magic style.

In May 2017, Tsai successfully auditioned for America's Got Talent Season 12 with an act he had developed himself. He was promoted to the next round by all four judges. Since the initial airing of the premiere, his performance has received over 40 million views. Although normally sporting a flashier fashion style, his toned down appearance on AGT was purposefully done to suit the audience, playing his real self as opposed to a stage persona, which is common in the magic industry.

Due to logistical errors in customs, his original intended act could not be performed. Tsai developed the aired AGT act within a week, and was able to perform on stage with no issues.

Tsai was featured on the cover of Vanish International Magic Magazine Edition 35, which was released in June 2017.

Tsai performed with Jay Chou during 2018's CCTV Spring Festival.

Personal life 
Tsai lives in Vancouver, British Columbia, Canada with his dog Mochi and his cat Fluffington. He has a strong relationship with both his grandmothers, and is cited saying they are his main source of inspiration.

During a job in Brazil, Tsai contracted a lung infection with a slim chance of survival. He remarkably made a full recovery.

Criticism 
Tsai has been criticised for using visual effects in order to advertise and sell consumer magic products. His America's Got Talent audition was also revealed to be digitally edited.

References

Canadian magicians
Living people
Year of birth missing (living people)